Stade Nautique d'Antwerp (Dutch:Zwemstadion van Antwerpen) was an aquatics venue located in Antwerp, Belgium. For the 1920 Summer Olympics, it hosted the diving, swimming, and water polo.

This was the first structure devoted to the aquatics events for the Summer Olympics.

During the swimming events, the water was described as cold and very dark, so much so that the swimmers had to be warmed up after every event. Diving events were held in the middle of the pool, with the divers themselves describing the water as cold and dark.

References
Sports-reference.com profile of Diving at the 1920 Summer Olympics.
Sports-reference.com profile of Swimming at the 1920 Summer Olympics.
Sports-reference.com profile of Men's water polo at the 1920 Summer Olympics.
Reaction of IOC in 1920 (in German)

Venues of the 1920 Summer Olympics
Defunct sports venues in Belgium
Olympic diving venues
Olympic swimming venues
Olympic water polo venues
Swimming venues in Belgium
Sports venues in Antwerp Province
Buildings and structures in Antwerp